Police Mutual is a trading style of Royal London Group.  Founded as a mutual society, set up in 1922 for the financial welfare of police officers, Police Mutual is a provider of financial services and welfare support to the Police Service. Open to both officers and staff, serving and retired, Police Mutual offers financial planning help and services.

In February 2014 Police Mutual acquired Forces Financial for an undisclosed fee.

On 1 October 2020 Police Mutual was transferred to Royal London (Royal London Mutual Insurance Society Limited). This included all subsidiaries, and thereafter the Police Mutual and Forces Mutual brands became trading styles of Royal London.  With over 210,000 members, Police Mutual was the UK’s largest affinity friendly society.

References

Financial services companies established in 1922
Companies based in Lichfield
Friendly societies of the United Kingdom